Joseph Bentley Bennett (April 21, 1859 – November 7, 1923) was a U.S. Representative from Kentucky.

Born in Greenup County, Kentucky, Bennett attended the common schools and Greenup Academy, Greenup, Kentucky.
He taught in the public schools.
He studied law.
He was admitted to the bar in 1878 and commenced practice in 1880.
He entered the mercantile business in 1885.
He served as judge of Greenup County 1894-1897.
He was reelected in 1897 and served until 1901.
He served as member of the Republican State central committee in 1900 and 1904.

Bennett was elected as a Republican to the Fifty-ninth, Sixtieth, and Sixty-first Congresses (March 4, 1905 – March 3, 1911).
He was an unsuccessful candidate for reelection in 1910 to the Sixty-second Congress.
He continued the practice of his profession until his death in Greenup, Kentucky, November 7, 1923.
He was interred in Riverview Cemetery.

References

1859 births
1923 deaths
American Disciples of Christ
Kentucky state court judges
Republican Party members of the United States House of Representatives from Kentucky
People from Greenup, Kentucky